"Wage Labour and Capital" (German: Lohnarbeit und Kapital) was an 1847 lecture by the critic of political economy and philosopher Karl Marx, first published as articles in the Neue Rheinische Zeitung in April 1849. It is widely considered the precursor to Marx’s influential treatise Das Kapital. It is commonly paired with Marx's 1865 speech Value, Price and Profit.  In 1883, a Russian translation was published as a book and included an excerpt from Capital volume 1 in the appendix, chapter 23 on Historical Tendency of Capitalist Accumulation. In 1885, a pamphlet version was first published as an English translation. An 1885 pamphlet based on the newspaper articles was published in Hottingen-Zürich without Marx's knowledge and with a brief introduction by Engels.  The German edition was revised by Friedrich Engels in 1891 and published by Vorwärts after the Anti-Socialist Laws had lapsed the previous year. In 1893, an updated English translation from the 1891 German edition was published in London.

Description 
The lecture and newspaper articles were meant to be a "popular" presentation of the economic relations under capitalism and the material basis for class struggle. It would suggest that class rule of the bourgeoisie in capitalist society rests on the wage slavery of the workers. The theory of surplus value explained the poverty experienced by the working class. The work also represents the depth to which Marx had developed his theories by the late 1840s.  It is an early theoretical formulation of Marxism, but did suggest alienated labor as a condition of accumulating labor in to capital through the capitalist mode of production. Marx suggested capitalism was a transitional historical period that would eventually lead to the proletarian revolution.

Main topics examined in the essay include labour power, labour, and how labour power becomes a commodity. The labour theory of value is introduced, which distinguishes between labour and labour power. The essay defines the term commodity and explores how the economic principles of supply and demand affect the pricing of certain commodities. Beyond that, the essay explores how capital and capitalism do not service any purpose other than to gain more of it, which Marx presents as an illogical method of living one's life.

Thus, "Wage-Labor and Capital" is considered by Marxists as an "in-depth economic and scientific observation on how capitalist economy works, why it was exploitative, and ultimately why it would eventually implode from within".

References

External links 

 Wage Labour and Capital at the Marxists Internet Archive
 

Books by Karl Marx
1849 books
1849 in economics
1849 essays